Grande Terre or Grande-Terre (French for "large land") is a generic term used in French to designate the main island of any given archipelago. As a specific toponym, it may refer to the following:

 Grande-Terre, the eastern half of the main island of Guadeloupe (divided by a canal across a narrow isthmus)
 Grande-Terre (Kerguelen), the main island of the Kerguelen Islands of the French Southern and Antarctic Lands
 Grande-Terre (Mayotte), the main island of Mayotte
 Grande Terre (New Caledonia), the main island of New Caledonia